= Teji Bazar =

Village in Uttar Pradesh, India

Coordinates: 25°49′N 82°26′E

Teji Bazar is a village in Garwara, Uttar Pradesh, India.
